Veturi Sundararama Murthy (29 January 1936 – 22 May 2010), known mononymously by his surname Veturi, was an Indian poet, lyricist and journalist who is popular for writing Telugu songs. His career in the Telugu cinema spanned more than four decades. He was highly admired and cherished for his deep and thoughtful lyrics in Telugu songs.

Early life
Veturi was born to Chandrasekhar Sastry and Kamalamba in Pedakallepalli, near Challapalli, Krishna into a Telugu Brahmin family. Veturi was a nephew of the Telugu Research Scholar Veturi Prabhakara Sastri. His grandfather Veturi Sundara Sastry was also a poet.

Education
Veturi completed his schooling in Diviseema, Jaggayyapeta, near Vijayawada in Krishna district, and SSLC in his grandmother's village. Later, Veturi went to Chennai for his intermediate studies and came back to Vijayawada where he completed his degree at S.R.R. Government College. He was a student of the legendary Viswanatha Satyanarayana at this college.

Career as a journalist
Veturi joined Andhra Prabha as a journalist in 1952, after his education. He learned the basics of editing a news article from his senior at Andhra Prabha, Narla Venkateswara Rao, whom he considers his first teacher. In 1959, he joined a weekly called Andhra Patrika, where Bapu and Mullapudi Venkata Ramana were his colleagues. He was the in-charge of the Cinema section at Andhra Patrika. He also worked for the Andhra Pradesh Congress Committee's official daily newspaper, called Andhra Janata, as an editor.

In 1962, he became the first and only Telugu journalist to interview the then Prime Minister, Jawaharlal Nehru, who came to inaugurate the Srisailam Hydroelectricity project. He covered the speeches of national leaders like Sarvepalli Radhakrishnan. In 1964, he worked as an assembly reporter.

His articles are said to be very catchy and witty. For instance, he referred to the meeting of MLAs in Hotel Dwaraka, near the Andhra Pradesh State Assembly as "Adigo Dwaraka - Ivigo Alamandalu" ("This is Dwaraka and here are the cattle"). His writing style caught the attention of the film industry due to his prowess in using traditional poetic rules related to alliteration and rhyme for describing current affairs.

Career as a lyricist

Entry into films

Veturi had contacts with the Telugu film industry during his days as a journalist. He used to meet veteran lyric writer Dasarathi often. Legendary director V. Nagayya offered him a role in his film, Naa Illu (1953). However, two days before the shooting began, Veturi decided not to act as he felt that he was not fit for acting, and wrote a letter of apology to Nagayya for rejecting his offer. N. T. Rama Rao, has invited him to join the film industry as a lyricist. In 1974, he wrote his first song, "Bharatanaari Charitamu", in the form of Harikatha, for O Seeta Katha (1974) under the direction of K. Viswanath.

1970s

In 1977, actor Sr. N.T.R's Adavi Ramudu showcased Veturi's talent for penning inspirational and romantic lyrics. The album was an instant hit among various audiences. In 1978, K Viswanath's Siri Siri Muvva proved his prowess in expressing diverse emotions with poetry. Acharya Aatreya, the leading lyricist in those days, was known to take days for writing a song. Veturi became the first choice for directors and producers too because of his ability to write a song to the director's taste in a few minutes. He went on to pen more than 5,000 songs in his career. He wrote more mass numbers for movies like Vetagadu and Driver Ramudu, and classics for movies like Sankarabharanam and Sagara Sangamam. In particular, Sankarabharanam stood as a landmark in the Telugu film industry.

1980s

After the surge of his popularity during the 1970s, he went on to work with a variety of directors and actors in the 1980s. He wrote classics for directors like Singeetam Srinivasa Rao, Dasari Narayana Rao, Bapu, Jandhyala, Vamsy and mass numbers for directors like Raghavendra Rao, A. Kodandarami Reddy, Vijaya Bapineedu. He delivered a number of hits for senior actors like Sr. N.T.R, Akkineni Nageswara Rao, Ghattamaneni Krishna, Shobhan Babu, Krishnam Raju and upcoming stars like Chiranjeevi, Nandamuri Balakrishna, Nagarjuna, Daggubati Venkatesh. This golden period in his career saw memorable albums like Saptapadi, Subhodayam, Subhalekha, Sagara Sangamam, Meghasandesam, Mudda Mandaram, Malle Pandiri, Nalugu Stambhalata, Rendu Jalla Seeta, Amarajeevi, Sreevariki Prema Lekha, Ananda Bhairavi, Srivari Sobhanam, Mogudu Pellalu, Chantabbai, Sitaara, Anveshana, Alapana, Mayuri, Amavasya Chandrudu, Janaki Ramudu and Geetaanjali.

1990s

During the late 1980s, Veturi's mass numbers garnered a lot of response from the public resulting in directors demanding more and more of them. However, Veturi still maintained his balance between classics and mass-numbers with movies like Jagadeka Veerudu Atiloka Sundari, Sarigamalu, Sitaramayya Gaari Manavaralu, Matru Devo Bhava, and Mechanic Alludu. Veturi was given the opportunity to dub many Tamil, Malayalam and Hindi movies. Some of his dubbed albums, for instance Iruvar and Devaraagam, received wide acclaim.

2000s

During this period, Veturi created classics like Gangotri and Swarabhishekam. His association with young directors like Sekhar Kammula and Gunasekhar produced some memorable albums, like Anand, Godavari, Varudu, Arjun, Premishte (Dubbed version of Kaadhal) and Leader.

Relations with other artists

Veturi had cordial relationships with the prominent figures of the industry. He worked with all classes of directors, producers, music directors and actors, ranging from stars to debutants. In his book Kommakommako Sannayi, he describes his relationship with some of the music directors, singers, lyricists, actors and directors he worked with. He was a teacher-like figure for many artists in the industry.

He is considered one of the most complete lyricist in the history of Telugu cinema. Even his competitors called him guru. Fellow lyricist Sirivennela praised him as a source of inspiration. He identified Veturi as the one who broadened the horizons of Telugu music. Sirivennela wrote an article in a Telugu monthly magazine, Haasam, explaining the breadth and depth of Veturi's poetry. Being a competitor, he ended the article saying: "aakaaSaannaakramiMchina aayana bhaavanaapaadaaniki, bhoogOLaanni aakramiMchina aayana bhaashaapaadaaniki bhaktithO aMjali ghaTistoo "naa mooDO paadaanni nee nettina peDataa" aMTunna aayana taaMDava paadaaniki bhayaMtO namaskaristoo, mummaaru mokkutoo"() which roughly translates to "I pray unto your two feet with devotion: one who has occupied the sky of imagination, one which has occupied the earth called language; and with terror, I pray salute the third foot which he says he would keep on my head". This is in reference to Vamana, an Avatar of Vishnu.

Veteran director K. Viswanath referred to him as brother. Director Sekhar Kammula referred to him as his guru. Actor, writer and director Tanikella Bharani referred to him as a manifestation of Saraswati in male form. Acclaimed director Mani Ratnam, who worked with him for Geetaanjali, praised him as one of the best he has come across.

Veturi was very flexible with remunerations while working with young and upcoming artists, which made him very approachable and close to almost every director and producer.

Awards and honors
Veturi received several national and regional awards for his contributions to literature and films. He has been conferred an honorary Doctorate in the 23rd convocation of Acharya Nagarjuna University. In 2007, he received the Jandhyala Memorial Award.

National Awards

He got the National Film Award for Best Lyrics for the song "Ralipoye Puvva" in the film Matrudevobhava, making him the second Telugu film lyricist to achieve the distinction after the revolutionary poet, Sri Sri. In 2006, he declared that he would return the National Award if Telugu is not given the status of Classical Language by the Government of India. In 2008, the Government of India declared Telugu as a classical language.

Filmfare Awards

He received filmfare award for the song, Uppongele Godavari in the 2006 movie, Godavari. In 2008, he received the Filmfare Lifetime Achievement Award.

Nandi Awards

He received the Nandi award for best lyrics, from the Government of Andhra Pradesh, six times. They are listed here.

Manaswini Awards

He received two Manaswini awards.
Song: Venuvai vachchaanu, Movie: Matrudevobhava, Year: 1993.
Song: Aakaashaana suryudundadu, Movie: Sundarakanda, Year: 1992.

Filmography
He wrote thousands of songs as a lyricist for many successful Telugu films. He has also acted in very few films in cameo roles. He acted as a fake swamiji in a film, which succeeded in producing good comedy. He also penned Dialogues along with writer Jandhyala for the movie Siri Siri Muvva.

1970s
 O Seeta Katha (1974) (lyrics: Bhaaratanaarii Charitamu (Harikatha))
 Adavi Ramudu (1977) (lyrics: Krushi Vunte Manushulu Rushulautaru)
 Pantulamma (1977) (lyrics: Maanasa Veenaa Madhu Geetam)
 Siri Siri Muvva (1978) (lyrics: Andaaniki Andam, Eavari Kevaru Ee Lokamlo, Gajje Gallumantuntae, Jhummandhi Nadam Sayyandi Padam, Maa Voori Devudamma, Odupunna Pilupu, Raa Digi Raa Divi Ninchi)
 Gorintaku (1979) (lyrics: Komma Kommako Sannayi)
 Sankarabharanam (1979) (lyrics: Sankara Nadasareena Para)

1980s
 Saptapadi (1981)
 Manchu Pallaki (1982) (lyrics)
 Subhalekha (1982) (lyrics: Raagaala Pallakilo Koyilamma Raaledu Eevela Endukammaa?)
 Khaidi (1983)
 Manthri Gari Viyyankudu (1983) (lyrics: Manasa Sirasa née namame padeda ee vela, Coconut manaku dosti okate asti raa, jabaru dasti cheste nasti raa, Chi chi po papa oppulakumma , Koluvainade urki korivayinade maa kobbarikayala subbarayude , Emanani née cheli padudane , Sala sala nanu kavinchanela )
 Meghasandesham (1983) (lyrics: Aakaasa Desaana Aashada Masaana)
 Mundadugu (1983)
 Sagara Sangamam (1983)
 Sitaara (1983)
 Rustum (1984)
 Agni Parvatam (1985) (lyrics: Agni Parvatam, Ee Gaalilo)
 Anveshana (1985) (writer: Edalo Laya, Keeravani, Ekanta Vela, Ilalo Kalise)
 Chantabbai (1986)
 Padamati Sandhya Ragam (1986)
 Pratighatana (1986) (lyrics: Ee Duryodhana Dussaasana Durvineeta Lokamlo)
 Aakhari Poratam (1988) (lyrics: Tella Cheeraku, Eppudu Eppudu)
 Marana Mrudangam (1988)
 Geetaanjali (1989) (lyrics: Jallanta Kavvinta Kaavaalile, Nandikonda Vaagullona, Jagada Jagada Jagadam, Om Namah Nayana Shrutulaku, O Paapaa Laalii!, Aamani Paadave Haayigaa)

1990s
 Jagadeka Veerudu Athiloka Sundari (1990) (lyrics: Abba Nee Teeyani Debba, dhinakkuta chamakkuro, mana bhaaratamlo, amdalalo ahomahodayam, jai chiranjiiva, jagadekaveera, priyatama nanu palakrinchu pranayama, yamaho ni yama yama andam)
 Chanti (1991) (lyrics: Pavuraniki Panjaraniki, idi tailam petti, jabiliki vennalaki puttina punnamile, o prema na prema, ennenno andalu)
 Gang Leader (1991) (lyrics: paalabugga, vayasu vayasu)
 Nirnayam (1991) (lyrics: Mila Mila Merisenu Tara)
 Dharma Kshetram (1992) (lyrics: Koramenu Komalam Sora Shobanam and more songs from this film)
 President Gari Pellam (1992) (lyrics: Nuvvu Malle Teega, Paruvala Kodi, Manduri Ambothu, Aa Oddu Ee Oddu, Umma Kavali, Kandirrega Nadumu Daani)
 Sundarakanda (1992) (lyrics: AakaaSaana SuuryuDunDaDu SandevELakE, kokilamma kotha pata paadindi, sundarakaamdaku sandade sandadi, inka inka, ulikipadaku, arey mava illaliki)
 Govinda Govinda (1993) (lyrics: O Naveena, andama anduma, indira mandira sundara taara, premante idena)
 Matru Devo Bhava (1993) (lyrics: Raalipoye Puvva Neeku Raagalenduke, venuvai vachanu bhuvananiki, kanniti kaluvalu, raagam anuragam)
 Mechanic Alludu (1993)
 Super Police (1994)
 Ramudochhadu (1996) (lyrics: Maa Palle Repallanta, Gumma Gumma Muddu Gumma, Vareva, Guvva Koose Puvvu Poose, srumgaara kaavyaala)
 Iddaru(1997)
 Annamayya(1997)
 Ravoyi Chandamama (1999) (lyrics: Nanda Nandana, Jagadajam Jawani, Swapna Venuvedo, Mallepuvva, Leta Leta, Love to Live, Jhummani Jhummani)
 Adbhutam (1999) (lyrics: lyrics  Nityam ekanta kshaname adiga)
 Chudalani Unadhi(1998) "Yamaha Nagari" Lyrics

2000s
 Badri (2000) (writer: Vevela Mainala Ganam Chali Pidugullo)
 Annayya (2000) (writer: Himaseemallo, Gusagusale, Vaana vallappa)
 sakhi (2000, Dubbed version) (lyrics: sakhiya celiya, alai pongera kanna, kaay love chedugudu, kalalai poyenu na premalu, snehituda snehituda, September maasam September maasam, ede ede vayyari varudu)
 Bava Nachadu (2001) (lyrics: Akka Bava Nachada)
 Mrigaraju (2001) (writer: Ramaiah Paadaletti, Satamanamannadile, Yelaley Yelalamma)
 Indra (2002) (writer: Ammadu Appachi)
 Tagore (2003) (writer: Manmadha Manmadha)
 Simhadri (2003)
 Anand (2004) (writer: Vacche Vacche, Yamunatheeram, Nuvvena, Charumati I Love You, Telisi Telisi, Yedalogaanam)
 Arjun (2004) (lyrics: Madhura Madhura Meenakshi)
 Arya (2004)
 Yuva (2004, Dubbed version)
 Premisthe (2004, Dubbed version)
 Chatrapati (2005)
Ghajini (2005 film) (lyrics: Rangola Ola, Oku Maru Kalisina)
 Godavari (2006) (lyrics: Uppongele Godavari)
 Sainikudu (2006)
 Madhumasam (2007)
 Happy Days (2007)
 Dashavataram (2008, Dubbed version)
 Kantri (2008) (lyrics: Vayasunamy)
 Sundarakanda (2008) (lyricist)
 Malli Malli (2009) (lyricist)
 Bendu Apparao R.M.P (2009)
 Varudu (2010) (lyrics: All songs)
 Leader (2010)
 Simha (2010) (lyrics: Kanulara Chudhamu) 
 Villain (2010) (dubbed version of Raavanan)
 Badrinath (2011) (lyrics: omkareshwari)
 Surya S/o Krishnan (2008) (dubbed version of Vaaranam Aayiram)
 Abhi(2011)("lyrics: Vangathota malupu kada")
 Bus Stop (2012) ("Lyrics: "Rekkalocchina Prema" and "Pattuko Pattuko")

Books

Sirikaakolanu Chinnadi

This book was originally a "musical play" telecasted on the All India Radio. The story describes the culture and people during the time of the king Krishna Deva Raya through the story of a Devadasi. The original play has music by the great music director Pendyala Nageswara Rao. One can see the beauty of the Telugu language in this book.
Veturi was introduced to the director K. Viswanath through this book and later their combination was a big hit. N.T.Rama Rao was so impressed by the story of this book that he wanted to make it as a movie. It is believed that there were some discussions on the script but the movie was never produced.

Kommako Kommako Sannaayi

A book titled komma kommakO sannAyi was published by "Veturi Sahitii Samiti". This book contains 27 articles written by Veturi celebrating his association with some famous personalities in the Telugu film industry. It also contains descriptions of some of his songs. The personalities covered include the following:
 Music directors: Pendyala Nageswara Rao, S. Rajeswara Rao, K. V. Mahadevan, Adi Narayana Rao, Ramesh Naidu, Rajan – Nagendra, Chakravarty, Ilayaraja, MM Keeravaani & A.R.Rahman
 Singers: S._P._Balasubrahmanyam
 Lyricists: Daita Gopalam, Samudrala (Sr), Atreya, Dasarathi,
 Actors: Nagayya, Jagayya, N. T. Rama Rao & Relangi
 Directors and producers: Nagi Reddy, Jandhyala, Bapu – Ramana

Many of these articles were originally published in a Telugu magazine called Haasam. Veturi's prowess in the Telugu language & literature and his vast knowledge of Carnatic music can be seen in this book. Veturi often quotes many of his own lyrics in this book and those examples offer a glimpse of his genius. In particular, his explanation of the song Swararaaga gangaa pravaahamE (Movie: Sarigamalu) is a masterpiece.

Personal life
Veturi was married to Seeta Maha Lakshmi and has three sons: Ravi Prakash, Chandrasekhar and Nanda Kishore.

Controversies
In March 2010, Veturi openly criticized the Film Nagar Cooperative Society officials for not handing over the 1000 sq.yard land that was allotted to him about 28 years ago. He alleged that several juniors and ineligible people were given plots ahead of him. He was allegedly offered a double bedroom flat for 1.5 million.

After his death, noted singer Mano and senior actor Vijay Chandar demanded the government to give the land to his family.

Death
Veturi died of a pulmonary hemorrhage at a private hospital in Hyderabad on 22 May 2010, aged 74, at about 9:30 p.m. local time. He was admitted to the hospital two days earlier and was kept in the Intensive Care Unit (ICU) there as his health was deteriorating.

K. Viswanath, who introduced Veturi to the film industry, stated that "his works would please even the gods". Director Sekhar Kammula, who worked with him to deliver some critically acclaimed songs, wrote a four-page article in the daily Sakshi describing Veturi's death as his "personal loss".

Legacy
Appaji Ambarisha Darbha, a creative digital-media professional turned actor made a font with the name "Veturi" which was inaugurated by Telugu lyricist Sirivennela Seetharama Sastry in 2018.

References

External links
 List of Veturi Movies
 Lyricist Sirivennela's article on Veturi, originally published in the magazine Haasam
 Srinivas Kanchibhotla's article on Veturi in Idlebrain
 Sekhar kammula's extensive article on veturi  on Idlebrain

1936 births
2010 deaths
Telugu-language lyricists
Telugu people
Telugu poets
Deaths from pulmonary hemorrhage
Filmfare Awards South winners
People from Krishna district
Film musicians from Andhra Pradesh
Poets from Andhra Pradesh
20th-century Indian composers
21st-century Indian composers
Indian lyricists
20th-century Indian poets
21st-century Indian poets
Best Lyrics National Film Award winners
Respiratory disease deaths in India